The lacrimal hamulus is a small, hook-like bony projection of the lacrimal bone. It is a continuation of the posterior lacrimal crest. It articulates with the lacrimal tubercle of the maxilla, and completes the upper orifice of the lacrimal canaliculus. It sometimes exists as a separate piece, and is then called the lesser lacrimal bone.

Structure 
The lacrimal hamulus is a  small, hook-like bony projection of the lacrimal bone. It is a continuation of the posterior lacrimal crest of the lacrimal bone. It articulates with the lacrimal tubercle of the maxilla. This completes the upper orifice of the lacrimal canaliculus.

Relations 
The lacrimal hamulus is usually around 9 mm from the infraorbital foramen, around 20 mm from the inferior orbital fissure, and around 31 mm from the beginning of the posterior lacrimal crest.

Variation 
The lacrimal hamulus develops from its own site of primary ossification of cartilage. Because of this, it sometimes exists as a separate piece, and is then called the lesser lacrimal bone.

See also 
 Hamulus

References 

Bones of the head and neck